Emile de Ruelle (14 December 1880 – 14 September 1948) was an American film editor known for his work in the British Film Industry, particularly with Alfred Hitchcock and Ewald André Dupont at British International Pictures.

Selected filmography
 Paradise (1928)
 Weekend Wives (1928)
 Widecombe Fair (1928)
 The Manxman (1929)
 The Informer (1929)
 The Vagabond Queen (1929)
 Under the Greenwood Tree (1929)
 Atlantic (1929)
 Alf's Carpet (1929)
 Blackmail (1929)
 Juno and the Paycock (1930)
 Two Worlds (1930)
 The Middle Watch (1930)

Bibliography
 St. Pierre, Paul Matthew. E.A. Dupont and his Contribution to British Film: Varieté, Moulin Rouge, Piccadilly, Atlantic, Two Worlds, Cape Forlorn. Fairleigh Dickinson University Press, 2010.

External links

1880 births
1948 deaths
American film editors
Artists from St. Louis